This is a chronological list of notable composers of the Republic of Turkey.

Hammamizade İsmail Dede Efendi (1778–1846)
Abdülaziz (1830–1876)
Murad V (1840–1904)
Leyla Saz (1850–1936)
Fehime Sultan (1875–1929)
The Turkish Five
Cemal Reşit Rey (1904–1985), symphonic music, operas, chamber music, operettas and musicals
Ulvi Cemal Erkin (1906–1972), symphonic music, choral music, solo piano, chamber music
Ahmed Adnan Saygun (1907–1991), symphonic music, oratorio, choral music, chamber music, opera, ballet music
Bülent Arel (1919–1990)
İlhan Usmanbaş (born 1921)
Ertuğrul Oğuz Fırat (1923–2014)
Nevit Kodallı (1925–2009) symphonic music
İlhan Mimaroğlu (1926–2012)
Ferit Tüzün (1929-1977)
Pınar Köksal (1946–2019)
Aydın Esen (born 1962)
Gülçin Yahya Kaçar (born 1966)
Özkan Manav (born 1967)
Emre Aracı (born 1968)
Fazıl Say (born 1970)
Füsun Köksal (born 1973)
Evrim Demirel (born 1977)
Oğuzhan Balcı (born 1977)
Murat Yakın (born 1977)
Zeynep Gedizlioğlu (born 1977)
Mehmet Erhan Tanman (born 1989)

Turkish
Composers